Art Munson (born August 17, 1940) is an American recording artist, session musician and guitarist. He has also been involved as a songwriter and record producer. Munson began his musical career playing with Dick Dale and the Del-Tones and later began touring with The Righteous Brothers and Paul Williams.

Munson has been seen with artists such as John Lennon, Barbra Streisand, Cher, Billy Joel, The Righteous Brothers, Paul Williams, Kris Kristofferson, Vonda Shepard, Brenda Russell, David Sanborn, and Bill Medley. He has even held minor roles in the 1974 movie Phantom of the Paradise and the 1976 movie A Star Is Born.

Munson is currently writing and producing music for TV some of which have appeared on Oprah, America's Got Talent, Entertainment Tonight and ABC World News.

External links
 www.ArtMunson.com
 

Living people
American rock musicians
American rock guitarists
American male guitarists
American pop guitarists
Lead guitarists
Rhythm guitarists
American session musicians
American male songwriters
1940 births